Mar Aprem Natniel, is the Assyrian Church of the East Bishop of Syria.

See also
Assyrian Church of the East's Holy Synod

References

Aprem Natniel
Living people
Year of birth missing (living people)